The 2014 American Athletic Conference men's basketball tournament was the first conference tournament of the American Athletic Conference (The American).  It was the first conference tournament held since the split of the original Big East Conference.  While The American is the legal successor to the old Big East, the rights to conference tournament in Madison Square Garden were retained by the new Big East, so the 2014 tournament was numbered as the new conference's first edition.  The tournament was held March 12–15 in the FedExForum in Memphis, Tennessee and decided a champion of the 2013–14 American Athletic Conference men's basketball season (like most NCAA conferences, The American recognizes both regular-season and tournament champions; Cincinnati and Louisville shared the regular-season title). The teams in the conference competed in a ten-team single-elimination tournament for an automatic bid to the 2014 NCAA tournament.

In the 2013–14 season, The American consisted of 10 members involved in the rearrangement of conferences between the 2013 and 2014 seasons. (Cincinnati, Connecticut, and South Florida) had been full members of the original Big East. One (Temple) had been a football-only Big East member before entering into full membership in The American. The remaining four schools (Houston, Memphis, SMU, and UCF) had previously been members of Conference USA.

Seeds
All teams in the American qualified for the tournament. Teams were seeded based on conference record and then a tie breaker system was used. Teams seeded 7–10 had to play in the opening round and teams seeded 1–6 received a bye to the second round. Louisville and Cincinnati finished with identical 15-3 records and shared the regular season title.  Since the Cardinals and Bearcats had split their meetings during the regular season, a coin toss was held to determine the #1 seed in the tournament, which was won by Cincinnati.

Schedule
All tournament games are nationally televised on an ESPN network:

Bracket

References

American Athletic Conference men's basketball tournament
2013–14 American Athletic Conference men's basketball season
College basketball tournaments in Tennessee
Basketball competitions in Memphis, Tennessee
2014 in sports in Tennessee